Prototrachea is a genus of moths of the family Noctuidae.

Species
 Prototrachea leucopicta (Kenrick, 1917)

References
Natural History Museum Lepidoptera genus database
Prototrachea at funet

Hadeninae